The Gorey Guardian is a local newspaper published once per week (every Tuesday) in County Wexford, Ireland. It is published in colour.

Content
The newspaper contains stories relating primarily to Gorey town and its surrounding area, as well as stories relating to County Wexford. The topics covered are wide ranging. It also contains a large number of photographs, which are published in colour. It has Advertisements and Sports sections. It also publishes Court reports.

Independent News & Media
Newspapers published in the Republic of Ireland
Mass media in County Wexford
Weekly newspapers published in Ireland